Mica is a group of sheet silicate minerals. 

Mica or MICA may also refer to:

Acronyms
 Mahone Islands Conservation Association
 Ministry of Information, Communications and the Arts (MICA), the former name for the Ministry of Communications and Information under the Government of Singapore
 Maryland Institute College of Art, in Baltimore, Maryland, US
 Markets in Crypto-Assets, is a proposed regulation in EU law. 
 Multimedia, Information, Communication & Applications, an international research institute in Hanoi, Vietnam
 Mudra Institute of Communications Ahmedabad, a postgraduate school in Ahemdabad, India
 Mobile Intensive Care Ambulance, an advanced prehospital care ambulance used in Australia and the United Arab Emirates
 MICA (missile), a French anti-aircraft missile system
 MHC class I polypeptide-related sequence A, a cell surface protein

Places

In Romania
 Mica, Cluj, a commune in Cluj County, Romania
 Mica, Mureș, a commune in Mureș County, Romania
 Mica, a village in Bascov Commune, Argeș County, Romania

In the United States
 Mica, Georgia, an unincorporated community
 Mica, Idaho, an unincorporated community in Idaho
 Mica, Virginia, an unincorporated community
 Mica, Washington, an unincorporated community
 Mica Peak, two adjacent peaks of the same name in Idaho and Washington

Elsewhere
 Mica Creek, a village and ski resort in British Columbia, Canada

Other 
 MicA RNA, a bacterial small RNA
 Milica, a female given name, for which "Mica" is a nickname
 "Mica", a song by Mission of Burma from their 1982 album Vs.
 DEC MICA, an unreleased operating system from Digital Equipment Corporation, which later inspired the architecture of Windows NT
 Mica DIY, a UK symbol group of retailers

See also 
 Mika, a given name and surname
 Micah (disambiguation)
 Myka (disambiguation)
 Micathermic heater